Germany competed at the 2014 Winter Olympics in Sochi, Russia, from 7 to 23 February 2014.
The first round of nominations was on 18 December, the second round on 23 January. Germany sent 153 athletes (76 men, 77 women). Chef de Mission was Michael Vesper. The outfitting was held in January at the Erding Air Base.

German president Joachim Gauck did not attend the 2014 Winter Olympics. He has not said publicly that the decision was a political gesture.

On 21 February it was announced that biathlete Evi Sachenbacher-Stehle had tested positive for methylhexanamine and was sent home from Sochi.

Medalists

Alpine skiing

Germany qualified seven quota places in alpine skiing.

Men

Women

Biathlon

Based on their performance at the 2012 and 2013 Biathlon World Championships, Germany qualified 6 men and 6 women.

Men

Women

Mixed

Bobsleigh

Men

* – Denotes the driver of each sled

Women

* – Denotes the driver of each sled

Cross-country skiing

Germany had 20 quota places, but only 15 achieved the national criteria.

Distance
Men

Women

Sprint
Men

Women

Curling

Germany qualified a men's team by winning the final qualification tournament.

Men's tournament

Roster: Christopher Bartsch, John Jahr, Sven Goldemann, Felix Schulze, Peter Rickmers

Preliminary round

Round-robin

Draw 1
Monday, February 10, 9:00 am

Draw 3
Tuesday, February 11, 2:00 pm

Draw 4
Wednesday, February 12, 9:00 am

Draw 5
Wednesday, February 12, 7:00 pm

Draw 7
Friday, February 14, 9:00 am

Draw 8
Friday, February 14, 7:00 pm

Draw 9
Saturday, February 15, 2:00 pm

Draw 11
Sunday, February 16, 7:00 pm

Draw 12
Monday, February 17, 2:00 pm

Figure skating

Germany will compete in all events.

Team trophy

Freestyle skiing

Halfpipe

Moguls

Ski cross

Qualification legend: FA – Qualify to medal round; FB – Qualify to consolation round

Slopestyle

Ice hockey

Germany qualified a women's team by winning a qualification tournament.

Women's tournament

Preliminary round Group B

5–8th place semifinal

Seventh place game

Luge

Germany earned the maximum quota of ten spots.

Men

Women

Mixed team relay

Nordic combined

Germany qualified a maximum of five athletes and a spot in the team relay.

Short track speed skating

Germany qualified 1 man and 1 woman during World Cup 3 and 4 in November 2013.

Men

Women

Qualification legend: ADV – Advanced due to being impeded by another skater; FA – Qualify to medal round; FB – Qualify to consolation round

Skeleton

Ski jumping

Germany qualified nine quota places in ski jumping.

Men

Women

Snowboarding

Alpine
Men

Women

Halfpipe

Qualification Legend: QF – Qualify directly to final; QS – Qualify to semifinal

Snowboard cross

Qualification legend: FA – Qualify to medal final; FB – Qualify to consolation final

Speed skating

Based on the results from the fall World Cups during the 2013–14 ISU Speed Skating World Cup season, Germany earned the following start quotas:

Men

Women

References

External links

 
 

Nations at the 2014 Winter Olympics
2014
Winter Olympics